The VinFast VF7 is an electric compact crossover SUV manufactured and marketed by VinFast of Vingroup.

Overview
The VF7 was first introduced to the public in January 2022 along with the VF5 and VF6 at the Consumer Electronics Show (CES). It was designed by Lee Jae Hoon, a senior exterior designer for General Motors.

References

External links 
 VinFast VF 7 Euro
 VF 7 Canada
 VF 7 US

Cars introduced in 2022
Crossover sport utility vehicles
Compact sport utility vehicles
Production electric cars
VF 7
Battery electric vehicles
Front-wheel-drive vehicles
All-wheel-drive vehicles